Shwegyin is a town in Bago District, Pegu region in Burma (Myanmar). It is the administrative seat of Shwegyin Township.

Climate

References

External links
"Shwegyin Map — Satellite Images of Shwegyin" Maplandia

Township capitals of Myanmar

Populated places in Bago Region